Phyllodes imperialis, the imperial fruit-sucking moth or pink underwing moth, is a noctuoid moth in the family Erebidae, subfamily Calpinae. It was first described by Herbert Druce in 1888. The species can be found in north-eastern Queensland to northern New South Wales, Papua New Guinea, Solomons, Vanuatu and New Caledonia.

Description
The "leaf-shaped" forewings are grey-brown and show a distinctive white or yellow marking which varies somewhat among populations. The ventral side of the forewing has a discal, dark-brown patch containing three white spots. The hindwings are dark brown to black with a large central pink patch extending to the inner margin, to which the common name "pink underwing moth" refers.

Early instars of the caterpillar are dull brown, but green individuals are also observed. Mature caterpillars are dark brown to reddish brown and show large eyespots. These are composed of a black pupil surrounded by a blue, then yellow ring. Between and below the eyespots are white markings, often described as looking like teeth, and resemble the teeth from a cartoon skeleton.

Subspecies
The following subspecies are known:
 Phyllodes imperialis imperialis from the Solomon Islands
 Phyllodes imperialis dealbata from New Caledonia and Vanuatu
 Phyllodes imperialis meyricki from the north of Australia and Papua New Guinea
 Phyllodes imperialis smithersi from the southeast of Queensland and the northeast of New South Wales

Food plants
The larvae feed on Menispermaceae species, including Carronia multisepala and Pycnarrhena australiana.

Gallery

References

Literature
Druce, H. (1888). "Descriptions of new species of Lepidoptera". Annals and Magazine of Natural History. (6): 234–242.

External links
 Caterpillar Eyespots – blog
 "Pink Underwing Moth: Rarity found on a Land for Wildlife property" – Land for Wildlife
 Searching for the southern pink underwing moth - New South Wales government notice

Catocalinae
Moths described in 1888